Thomas James Perkins was intendant Mayor of Tallahassee, Florida, and a partner in a cotton trading business.

He settled in Tallahassee in 1837, years before statehood, and worked for a railroad company.  The Florida Archives have a portrait of him and his wife Amelia Mather Keowin Perkins. They had ten children.

References

External links
Findagrave entry

Mayors of Tallahassee, Florida